Cilan may refer to:

Cilan Uchaf, a village in Gwynedd, Wales
Cilən (sometimes spelt 'Cilan'), a village in Azerbaijan
Cilan, a Gym Leader in the Pokémon Black and White video games
Cilan, the version of the Gym Leader in the Pokémon: Black & White anime